The Born-Alive Infants Protection Act of 2002 ("BAIPA") is an Act of Congress. It affirms legal protection to an infant born alive after a failed attempt at induced abortion. It was signed by President George W. Bush.

Legislative history
 Based on  - passed March 12, 2002
 Introduced on June 14, 2001
 Reported by Committee on August 2, 2001
 Passed House on March 12, 2002
 Passed Senate by unanimous consent July 18, 2002.
 Signed into law by President Bush in Pittsburgh at the Pittsburgh Hilton. on August 5, 2002
 The original author of the bill was Congressman Charles T. Canady of Florida who had by then retired from Congress.

Committee of the House
The bill was approved by the committee on July 12, 2001. The committee consisted of 32 representatives, 25 of which voted for the bill, 2 against and 10 were not present during the vote. This vote allowed the bill to be passed onto the entire house of representatives.

See also 
 Born alive rule
 Baby Doe Law
 Gianna Jessen
 Jill Stanek
 Kermit Gosnell

References 

Acts of the 107th United States Congress
Abortion law
United States federal abortion legislation